The 1925 Nebraska Wesleyan Coyotes football team was an American football team that represented Nebraska Wesleyan University as a member of the North Central Conference (NCC) during the 1925 college football season. In its first season under head coach Clarence L. Dow, the team compiled a 6–0–2 record (3–0–1 against NCC opponents), shut out seven of eight opponents, did not allow its goal line to be crossed, and outscored all opponents by a total of 76 to 3. The team played its home games at Johnson Field in Lincoln, Nebraska.

Fullback Oscar Wiberg was the team captain. Wiberg and tackle Huyck were selected as first-team players on the 1925 All-North Central Conference football team.

Schedule

References

Nebraska Wesleyan
Nebraska Wesleyan Prairie Wolves football seasons
North Central Conference football champion seasons
College football undefeated seasons
Nebraska Prairie Football